Saint John Energy, formerly known as Power Commission of the City of Saint John and Civic Hydro, is the electrical utility reseller of power purchased from NB Power in Saint John, New Brunswick. It was founded in 1922 and now serves over 36,000 customers.

The utility sells 950GWh of electricity annually, however the utility has no electrical generating capacity of its own.

References

External links

 Saint John Energy

Electric power companies of Canada
Companies owned by municipalities of Canada
Energy in New Brunswick